This is a list of small arms used during the 20th century.

Sidearms 

 Mauser C96
 Luger pistol
 Walther P38
 PPK
 Beretta 92
 Beretta 93R
 Jericho 941
 Daewoo K5
 Desert Eagle
 M1911
 Model 1902 Sporting
 Beretta 8000
 Colt M1900
 Colt Model 1902 Military
 Colt Model 1903 Pocket Hammerless
 Model 1905 Military
 Model 1907 Military
 Model 1909
 Model 1910
 Glock 17
 Makarov PM
 Heckler & Koch USP
 Browning Hi-Power
 Steyr M Series
 M9 Pistol

Submachine guns 

 Owen gun (1942–1960s) – Australian submachine gun used in World War II and subsequent conflicts until the 60s
 F1 submachine gun (1962–1991) – Australian submachine gun intended to replace the Owen gun
 Steyr AUG 9 mm (1977)
 FN P90 (1990–present) – Belgian personal defense weapon, a submachine gun but with a scaled down intermediate rifle cartridge
 MP 18 (1918–1945) – German submachine gun, world's first widely used and successful
 MP 28 (1928–early 1940s) – An improvement of the MP 18
 Steyr-Solothurn MP 34 (1930–1970s) – Often called "The Rolls-Royce of submachine guns", the Steyr-Solothurn MP 34 is based on the MP 28 made from the best quality materials available at the time
 MP 35 (1935–1945) – An improved submachine gun based on the MP 28
 MP40 (1940–1945 in Germany) – The MP 40 is a simplified MP 38, intended to replace older, more expensive submachine guns. This particular submachine gun is widely used by Germany in World War II
 Walther MP (1963–present) – Intended to rearm military and police forces positioned in West Germany, also used by the German Intelligence Service and some American troops stationed in the region
 HK MP5 (1966–present) – the most widely used submachine gun of the later half of the 20th century 
 UZI (1954–present) – Israeli submachine gun, one of the first designs to implement a system to accommodate the magazine in the pistol grip
 PM-63 Rak (1965–present)
 Sten (1941–1960s in UK) – British submachine gun used extensively throughout World War II
 Sterling submachine gun (1944–present) – Designed as a replacement for the Sten in 1945 but only started its process in the 50s
 PPD-40 (1935–45) – The submachine gun used by the Russians before the implementation of the PPSh-41
 PPSh-41 (1941–1960s in USSR) – Russian submachine gun distinctive for its high rate of fire
 PPS (1942–1960s in USSR) – Family of submachine guns used alongside the PPSh family 
 Thompson submachine gun (1938–1971 in USA) – Family of submachine guns designed in 1910 and onwards, The Thompson is a famous submachine gun commonly associated with American gangsters
 M3 submachine gun (1943–present) – A cheaper and lighter alternative to the Thompson submachine gun
 MAC 10 (1970–present) – Family of submachine guns, famous among media for their association with gangs
 American 180 (Designed in the 1960s, never implemented) – Chambered in 22 LR. It was described as being a "swarm of angry bees" shooting 1200 rounds per minute, it relied on shattering enemy armor through consistent and repetitive fire

Automatic rifles 

 StG 44 – The first widely issued assault rifle in the world
 AK-47 – a famous Soviet automatic rifle whose derivatives have been used in almost every conflict since its invention in 1947
 AKM- an upgraded version AK-47. The stamped receiver drastically cut down production times, which allowed just about any country to manufacture it. The most common variant of this weapon; most rifles that are referred to as AK-47s are in fact AKMs.
 AKMS – a Paratroop model of the AKM with a folding stock
 AK-74 – a newer model of the AK series; it fired a newer and smaller round, the 5.45mm
 AKS-74 – a model of AK-74 designed for paratroopers
 AK-74M – updated version of AK-74
 FARA 83 – Argentinian automatic rifle
 Steyr AUG – an Austrian bullpup rifle
 Steyr ACR
 FN FNC
 IMBEL MD -Brazilian 5.56 rifle based on the FN FAL
 Diemaco C7 – a Canadian copy of the M16
 Type 56 – Chinese AK-47 clone
 Type 68
 Chinese Type 81 Assault Rifle
  Type 86
 Type 95
 Daewoo K1 – Korean automatic rifle
 Daewoo K2 – standard rifle of the South Korean army
 APS-95
 GIAT FAMAS – bullpup rifle, standard issue of France
 Heckler & Koch HK33
 Heckler & Koch HK41
 Heckler & Koch G36- standard rifle of the German Army
 Heckler & Koch G11
 Enfield EM2 – prototype British automatic rifle that was never adopted
 L85 – standard bullpup of the British Army
 IMI Galil
 Howa Type 89
 AR-10
 M16 rifle – standard issue automatic rifle of the US
 CAR-15
 M4 carbine – standard carbine of the US
 Stoner 63
 Mini-14
 AR-18
 AN-94
 Ak 4
 Ak 5
 Rk 62
 INSAS
 SAR-21
 A-91
 AAI ACR
 XM29 OICW
 AAI SBR
 AAA Leader Dynamics SAC
 AAI XM70
 AEK-971
 AL-7
 AMD 65
 AMP-68
 AN11 TISS
 AN-94
 APS underwater rifle
 AR-11
 AR-16
 Arms-Tech COMPAK-16
 Arsenal AKSU
 Arsenal SLR-95
 Bernardelli VB-SR
 FN FAL

Battle rifles 

 M1 Garand (1936–1958) – The standard rifle of the United States during the Second World War
 M1941 Johnson rifle (1941–1961 Worldwide) – A rare rifle issued to marine raiders early during the war
 M1903 Springfield rifle (1903–1975) – The standard issue rifle of the U.S. in World War I it became a sniper weapon in the next world war
 M1917 Enfield rifle (1917–present worldwide) – A supplement for the M1903 during World War I
 MAS 36 (1936–present worldwide) – Standard rifle of the French in World War II
 Ross rifle (1905–1945)
 Gewehr 98 (1898–1935) – Standard rifle of Germany in World War I
 Karabiner 98k (1935–present) – Standard rifle of Germany in World War II, the smaller version of the Gewehrkarabiner98 (Gewehr 98)
 Lee–Enfield SMLE (MLE: 1895–1926/SMLE: 1904–present) – The standard rifle of the British Empire during the first half of the 20th century
 Carcano M91 (1981–present Worldwide)
 Arisaka type 38 (1906–1945)
 Arisaka type 99 (1939–1945)
 Mosin–Nagant (1891–present) – The standard Issue Russian/Soviet rifle for almost the entire first half of the 20th century
 K31 (1933–1958) – Standard Swiss rifle from 1933 to 1958
 SAFN 49 (1948–1982)
 ZH-29 (Uncertain time frame between its adoption and last use in military, presumably between early 1930s to mid 1950s)
 Hakim Rifle (1950s–early 1960s) – A slightly modified Ag m/42 rifle used by the Egyptian military
 Rasheed Carbine (1950s–early 1960s) – Egyptian carbine derived from the Hakim Rifle
 RSC M1917 (1917–1926) – Officially named Fusil Automatique Modèle 1917 by the French army
 MAS 49 (1951–1979) 
 FG 42 (1943–1970s) – An automatic rifle built for German paratroopers
 Gewehr 43 (1943–1945) – Fairly successful semi-automatic German gun compared to the others, was designed from captured SVT-40
 SVT-40 (1940–present) – Widely issued Soviet semi-automatic rifle
 SVT-38 – (Subsection of article SVT-40)
 FN FAL (1953–present) – Designed in Belgium, widely adopted by NATO countries during the cold war
 Heckler & Koch G3 (1959–present Worldwide) – Used by the German military before the adoption of the G36
 M14 rifle (1959–present) – An upgrade from the M1, its use was limited since 1964
 SKS (1945–present)

Sniper rifles 

 Dragunov SVD
 M21 rifle
 M40 rifle
 L96A1
 M82 Barrett rifle
 Heckler & Koch PSG1
 M24 Sniper Weapon System
 Steyr Scout
 Tabuk Sniper Rifle

Machine guns 

 Steyr AUG/HBAR
 FN Minimi
 FN MAG
 Type 67 GPMG
 MG34
 MG42
 MG3
 Bren light machine gun
 DPM
 RPD
 RPK
 PK machine gun
 IMI Negev
 Daewoo K3
 M1918 Browning Automatic Rifle
 M60 machine gun
 M2 Browning Machine Gun
 M249 light machine gun
 Stoner 63
 Mk 48 Mod 0 machine gun
 M2HB
 Type 100
 AAT Mod 52
 MG36
 Vickers machine gun
 Lewis gun

Explosive devices 

 Panzerfaust
 Panzerschreck
 M79 grenade launcher
 M203 grenade launcher
 M67
 Bazooka
 FGM-148 Javelin
 RPG-7
 Stinger
 GP-25 – mostly used Kalashnikov AKs

20th-century
Weapons